Aqa Jakandi (also Romanized as Āqā Jakandī and Āqāj Kandī; also known as Āghāj Kandī and Āqāj Akanī) is a village in Malmir Rural District, Sarband District, Shazand County, Markazi Province, Iran. At the 2006 census, its population was 188, in 46 families.

References 

Populated places in Shazand County